Lee Kohlmar (27 February 1873 – 14 May 1946) was a German film actor and director. He appeared in more than 50 films between 1916 and 1941. He also directed nine films between 1916 and 1921. He was born in Forth and died in Hollywood, California, from a heart attack. Fred Kohlmar was his son.

Partial filmography

 Judy Forgot (1915) - Dr. Lauberscheimer
 The Secret Gift (1920) - Jan
 The Flaming Disc (1920) - Professor Robert Wade
 Beautifully Trimmed (1920) - Drake
 Orphans of the Storm (1921) - King Louis XVI
 High Heels (1921, director)
 The Cactus Kid (1921, Short, Director)
 Who Was the Man? (1921, Short, Director)
 The Wild Wild West (1921, Short, Director)
 Bandits Beware (1921, Short, Director)
 The Man Who Woke Up (1921, Short, Director)
 Beating the Game (1921, Short, Director)
 Breaking Home Ties (1922) - Father Bergman
 Potash and Perlmutter (1923) - Pasinsky
 The Kibitzer (1930) - Yankel
 The Melody Man (1930) - Adolph
 Personality (1930) - Mr. Himmelschlosser
 Children of Pleasure (1930) - Bernie
 Caught Short (1930) - Peddler
 The Sins of the Children (1930) - Dr. Heinrich Schmidt
 The Strange Case of Clara Deane (1932) - Moses Herzman
 Huddle (1932) - Leo - the Tailor (uncredited)
 The Tenderfoot (1932) - Waiter (uncredited)
 Jewel Robbery (1932) - Hollander
 False Faces (1932) - Earl Wyman (uncredited)
 Scarlet Dawn (1932) - German Tailor (uncredited)
 Silver Dollar (1932) - Hook
 The Match King (1932) - Jeweler (uncredited)
 She Done Him Wrong (1933) - Jacobson (uncredited)
 Forgotten (1933) - Papa Strauss
 Emergency Call (1933) - Elderly Motorist (uncredited)
 I Love That Man (1933) - Old Man Cohen
 Roman Scandals (1933) - Storekeeper
 Son of Kong (1933) - Mickey, 2nd Process Server (uncredited)
 The House of Rothschild (1934) - Doctor
 Twentieth Century (1934) - Beard #2 (uncredited)
 Shoot the Works (1934) - Prof. Jonas
 When Strangers Meet (1934) - Sam Rosinsky
 Music in the Air (1934) - Priest (uncredited)
 The Best Man Wins (1935) - Old German Student (uncredited)
 One More Spring (1935) - Piccolo Player
 Ruggles of Red Gap (1935) - Jailer at Red Gap (uncredited)
 McFadden's Flats (1935) - (uncredited)
 Four Hours to Kill! (1935) - Pa Herman
 Love in Bloom (1935) - Pop Heinrich
 Break of Hearts (1935) - Schubert
 Death from a Distance (1935) - Prof. Ernst Einfeld
 The Farmer Takes a Wife (1935) - Bearded Townsman (uncredited)
 Here Comes Cookie (1935) - Mr. Dingledorp
 The Girl Friend (1935) - German Landlord (uncredited)
 Rendezvous (1935) - Tailor (uncredited)
 Parole! (1936) - Bernstein (uncredited)
 A Son Comes Home (1936) - Proprietor
 Ramona (1936) - Woodcarver Lang (uncredited)
 Wanted! Jane Turner (1936) - John Taylor (uncredited)
 The King and the Chorus Girl (1937) - Second Violinist (uncredited)
 Fly-Away Baby (1937) - Papa - Zeppelin Passenger (uncredited)
 Walter Wanger's Vogues of 1938 (1937)  - Employment Clerk (uncredited)
 The Rookie Cop (1939) - Gus - the Night Watchman (uncredited)
 Four Sons (1940) - Doctor (uncredited)
 The Big Store (1941) - Mr. David (uncredited)

References

External links

1873 births
1946 deaths
German male film actors
Film directors from Bavaria
German male silent film actors
20th-century German male actors
German emigrants to the United States
People from Erlangen-Höchstadt